Benjamin Balint (born 1976) is an American-Israeli author, journalist, educator, and translator.  His 2018 book explores the literary legacy of Franz Kafka.

Writing career 
Balint was assistant editor for Commentary magazine. He contributes regularly to the Wall Street Journal, Die Zeit, Haaretz, the Weekly Standard, and the Claremont Review of Books.

His 2018 book Kafka’s Last Trial narrates the journey of Kafka's manuscripts from Czechoslovakia to Israel's National Library. For this work, Balint was awarded the 2020 Sami Rohr Prize for Jewish Literature. The book was also a finalist for the 2020 Wingate Literary Prize.

Balint was a fellow at the Hudson Institute and Van Leer Jerusalem Institute.

Personal life
Balint lives in Jerusalem.

Bibliography

References 

1976 births
Living people
American male writers
Jewish American writers
21st-century American Jews
Franz Kafka scholars
Hudson Institute